André Léon Marie Nicolas Rieu (born 1 October 1949) is a Dutch violinist and conductor best known for creating the waltz-playing Johann Strauss Orchestra.

Rieu and his orchestra have turned classical and waltz music into a worldwide concert touring act. He resides in his native Maastricht.

Early life and family 
The name Rieu is of French Huguenot origin, though both of Rieu's parents were Roman Catholic. André was born to Andries Antonie Rieu and is the third of six children. He has two older sisters (Teresia and Cilia), two younger brothers (Robert and Jean-Philippe), and a younger sister (Gaby Buirma-Rieu).

Rieu's father was conductor of the Maastricht Symphony Orchestra. Showing early promise, André began studying violin at the age of five. From a very early age, he developed a fascination with orchestra. He studied violin at the Conservatoire Royal in Liège and at the Conservatorium Maastricht, (1968–1973), studying under Jo Juda and Herman Krebbers.

From 1974 to 1977, he attended the Music Academy in Brussels, studying with André Gertler. He completed his training with the distinction "Premier Prix" from the Royal Conservatory of Brussels.

He married Marjorie Kochmann in 1975. She has been a language teacher and has written compositions. They have two sons, Marc and Pierre.

He speaks six languages: Dutch, English, German, French, Italian and Spanish.

Career

Johann Strauss Orchestra 

Rieu created the Johann Strauss Orchestra in 1987 and began with 12 members, giving its first concert on 1 January 1988. As of 2020, he performs with between 50 and 60 musicians. Rieu plays a 1667 Stradivarius violin.

Rieu and his orchestra have appeared throughout Europe, North and South America, Japan, and Australia. In 2008, Rieu's tour featured a full-size reproduction of Empress Sisi's Castle, the biggest stage to have gone on tour at that time.

Recent world tour results in Billboard / Pollstar annual worldwide top tours lists

For two weeks in 2013, one of the channels of the BSkyB group, Sky Arts 2 in the UK, was renamed as Sky Arts Rieu. Between 30 March and 14 April 2013 Sky Arts Rieu broadcast Rieu concerts and documentaries 24 hours per day.

Rieu also composed music for the 2014 film Tuscan Wedding.

Reception

Australia 
Chris Boyd, a critic writing for Melbourne's Herald Sun newspaper, did not criticize his playing, but described Rieu's main stage function as "blarney and delegation."

Eamon Kelly wrote in The Australian newspaper: "It is disappointing to see professional journalists indulging in cheap, inaccurate stereotypes to dismiss criticism of Rieu." He also wrote: "Equally misguided are those who cursorily dismiss Rieu. Rieu's live and recorded performances have brought joy to millions of people. Few in his audiences are regular classical music attendees and it could be seen as promising that, via Rieu, they are listening to standards of the classical canon. The fact that Rieu's focus is on highly accessible, enjoyable repertoire is not an argument against his musical credentials."

By December 2008, Rieu had achieved his 100th platinum accreditation in Australia and by May 2011, Rieu had sold over $50 million worth of wholesale shipments of his CDs and DVDs in Australia and was the highest-selling music artist in the Australian market between 2006 and 2011.

Honours
 Knight of the Order of the Netherlands Lion (Netherlands, 2002)
 Honorary Medal of the Province of Limburg (Netherlands, 2009)
 Knight of the Order of the Arts and the Letters (France, 2009)
 Grand Decoration in Silver of the Decoration of Honour for Services to the Republic of Austria (Austria, 2011)
 Order of Bahrain (Bahrain, 2023)

Selected discography

Albums

Videos

References

Further reading

External links

 
 André Rieu (official website)
 André Rieu's Official Australian website
 André Rieu (C Music TV Biography)
 
 The Magic of Andre Rieu 
 André Rieu official channel on YouTube

1949 births
Living people
20th-century conductors (music)
20th-century classical violinists
20th-century Dutch musicians
20th-century Dutch male musicians
21st-century conductors (music)
21st-century classical violinists
21st-century Dutch musicians
21st-century male musicians
Chevaliers of the Ordre des Arts et des Lettres
Dutch classical violinists
Dutch conductors (music)
Dutch people of French descent
Easy listening musicians
Knights of the Order of the Netherlands Lion
Maastricht Academy of Music alumni
Male classical violinists
Male conductors (music)
Musicians from Maastricht
Recipients of the Decoration of Honour for Services to the Republic of Austria